The Pantanal Matogrossense National Park is a national park in the state of Mato Grosso at the border to Mato Grosso do Sul, Brazil.

Location
It is in the Pantanal biome.
The park was created by decree nº 86.392 on 24 September 1981, and is managed by the Chico Mendes Institute for Biodiversity Conservation (ICMBio). It covers parts of the municipalities of Corumbá in Mato Grosso do Sul, and Cáceres and Poconé in Mato Grosso. It adjoins the Guirá State Park to the north. The Cuiabá River runs through Pantanal Matogrossense National Park. The park is in the Pantanal Biosphere Reserve, which also includes the Chapada dos Guimarães, Emas and Serra da Bodoquena national parks, and the Serra de Santa Bárbara and Nascentes do Rio Taquari, Pantanal de Rio Negro state parks.

Conservation
The park is classed as IUCN protected area category II (national park).
The park's basic objective is preservation of natural ecosystems of great ecological relevance and scenic beauty and enabling scientific research, environmental education, outdoor recreation and ecological tourism.
The park was listed as a "Wetland of International Importance" under the Ramsar Convention in 1993.

Protected species include the jaguar (Panthera onca), ocelot (Leopardus pardalis), marsh deer (Blastocerus dichotomus), giant anteater (Myrmecophaga tridactyla), giant armadillo (Priodontes maximus), giant otter (Pteronura brasiliensis), chestnut-bellied guan (Penelope ochrogaster), black-and-tawny seedeater (Sporophila nigrorufa) and the mussel Lamproscapha ensiformis.

Notes

References

Sources

 
 
 
 
 

National parks of Brazil
Pantanal
Protected areas of Mato Grosso
Protected areas of Mato Grosso do Sul
Protected areas established in 1981
1981 establishments in Brazil
Ramsar sites in Brazil